George "Guido" Lombardi (born 1950s) is an American real estate investor who is an advisor to Donald Trump.  He is credited with launching social media groups supporting Trump's candidacy for U.S. president in 2016, such as "Latinos for Trump", though he was never officially part of the campaign.

Lombardi emigrated to the United States from Italy in the 1970s. He is a former executive director of the International Council for Economic Development and the author of a book "Liberta' e Progresso Economico" (Freedom and Economic Progress).

Lombardi received requests to meet with Trump from right-wing leaders in Europe, including French member of European Parliament and head of the National Front Marine Le Pen, Hungarian Prime Minister Viktor Orbán and members of Austria's Freedom Party. Lombardi relayed the messages, but few requests to meet Trump have been granted. Lombardi was famously spotted with Marine Le Pen having coffee at Trump Tower in New York, where Lombardi lives as neighbor of Donald Trump.

He received at the Italian Parliament in Rome the America Award of the Italy-USA Foundation in 2018.

External links 
 Official website

References 

1950s births
Living people
American people of Italian descent
Donald Trump 2016 presidential campaign
People associated with the 2016 United States presidential election
Tea Party movement activists